Edward Charles Van Impe (born May 27, 1940) is a Canadian former professional ice hockey defenceman who played in the National Hockey League (NHL) for the Chicago Black Hawks, Philadelphia Flyers and Pittsburgh Penguins.

Playing career
After playing his first five professional seasons with the Buffalo Bisons of the AHL, Ed Van Impe saw his first NHL action with the Chicago Black Hawks in 1966–67. He had a solid rookie season as he was voted the runner-up to Bobby Orr for the Calder Memorial Trophy.

Left unprotected for the expansion draft that off-season, the Philadelphia Flyers picked Van Impe off the Black Hawks' roster. He played eight and a half seasons with the Flyers and was one of the team's best defensive blueliners, serving as the second captain in franchise history, from 1968 to 1973. His forte was hitting and shot-blocking, as well as clearing opponents from the area of his team's net. He was part of the Broad Street Bullies teams that won two Stanley Cups, in 1974 and 1975.

On January 11, 1976, at the Spectrum, Van Impe's Flyers, as part of Super Series '76, played a memorable exhibition game against the Soviet Union's dominant Central Red Army team. Having just finished serving a hooking penalty, Van Impe left the penalty box and immediately placed a devastating hit on the Soviet Union's Valeri Kharlamov, knocking the latter unconscious and causing him to lay prone of the ice for a short while. Van Impe's hit was not penalized and it resulted in the Soviets leaving the ice midway through the first period in protest. After a 17-minute delay, the Soviets finally returned to the ice after they were warned that they would lose their salary for the entire series (200,000 USD) if they did not.

Van Impe's Flyer career came to an end midway through the 1975–76 season as he was traded to the Pittsburgh Penguins along with Bobby Taylor for Gary Inness and cash. His Penguins career lasted 22 games, as he retired in 1976–77.

Awards
Won two Stanley Cups with the Philadelphia Flyers (1974, 1975)
Played in NHL All-Star Game three times (1969, 1974, 1975)
Inducted into Flyers Hall of Fame (1993)

Career statistics

Regular season and playoffs

External links
 
Flyers History Flyers Hall of Fame profile

1940 births
Living people
Buffalo Bisons (AHL) players
Calgary Stampeders (WHL) players
Canadian ice hockey defencemen
Canadian people of Dutch descent
Chicago Blackhawks players
Sportspeople from Saskatoon
National Hockey League All-Stars
Philadelphia Flyers captains
Philadelphia Flyers players
Pittsburgh Penguins players
Stanley Cup champions
Ice hockey people from Saskatchewan